Adaba FM (88.9 MHz) is a radio station situated at Ilara-Mokin in Ifedore Local Government Area of Ondo State, Nigeria.

References 

Radio stations in Nigeria
Radio stations established in 2008
2008 establishments in Nigeria